Marcelo Demoliner and João Souza were the defending champions but lost to Thiemo de Bakker and André Sá in the final 6–3, 6–2.

Seeds

Draw

Draw

References
 Main Draw

Peugeot Tennis Cup - Doubles
2013 Doubles